Girolamo Mattei (1606 - 1676) was an Italian nobleman of the House of Mattei and Duke of Giove.

Mattei was born in 1606, the son of Asdrubale Mattei, Marquis di Giove, and his wife Costanza Gonzaga (of the House of Gonzaga). He was the older brother of Luigi Mattei; Marquis di Belmonte and military ally of the Barberini and Pope Urban VIII. He was a nephew of Ciriaco Mattei and Cardinal Girolamo Mattei.

In 1643, Pope Urban VIII issued a papal bull recognising Giove as a Duchy of the Mattei, thus making Girolamo Mattei, Duca di Giove. His bull was issued with the words, affinché la terra sia adorna al titolo più degno (roughly: that the earth is adorned with those more worthy of title).

Family
In 1666 he married Eugenia Spada (1639-1717), sister of Cardinal Fabrizio Spada. He had at least one child, Alessandro Mattei (1670-1729), who inherited his father's titles.

References

1606 births
1676 deaths
Dukes of Italy
Date of birth unknown
Date of death unknown
Place of birth unknown
Place of death unknown